The US President's Committee for Hungarian Refugee Relief was established by President Dwight D. Eisenhower on December 12, 1956. Tracy S. Voorhees served as chairman. The need for such a committee came about as a result of the United States' desire to provide for a share of the Hungarians who fled their country beginning in October 1956. The Committee operated until May 1957. During this time, the Committee helped re-settle in the United States over 30,000 Hungarian refugees. The committee's small staff was funded from the Special Projects Group appropriation.  A portion of the committee's records are preserved in Voorhees' papers in Special Collections and University Archives at Rutgers University and are accessible online.

Duties and objectives 
To assist in every way possible the various religious and other voluntary agencies engaged in work for Hungarian refugees.
To coordinate the efforts of these agencies, with special emphasis on those activities related to resettlement of the refugees. The committee also served as a focal point to which offers of homes and jobs could be forwarded.
To coordinate the efforts of the voluntary agencies with the work of the interested governmental departments.

References

External links
U.S. President's Committee for Hungarian Refugee Relief Records, Dwight D. Eisenhower Presidential Library
Hungarian Refugees Received on Prince Edward Island, Canada (1956-1957)
Resources on Refugees of the Revolution of 1956 in the United States

1956 establishments in the United States
1957 disestablishments in the United States
Hungarian Refugee Relief
Hungary–United States relations